, nicknamed Narikoku (成国), is a senior high school in Narita, Chiba.

The school offers an "international course".

Viewbank College in Australia has an association with Narita Kokusai.
Kennedy High School in Cedar Rapids, Iowa is the sister school and does exchange programs with Narita.

History
It opened in 1975 as Chiba Prefectural Narita Nishi (West) High School (千葉県立成田西高等学校 Chiba-kenritsu Narita Nishi Kōtōgakkō). In 1992 it was given its current name.

References

External links
 Narita Kokusai High School
 Narita Kokusai High School 
  

1975 establishments in Japan
Educational institutions established in 1975
High schools in Chiba Prefecture
Narita, Chiba